Kota Factory is an Indian Hindi-language streaming television series created by Saurabh Khanna, directed by Raghav Subbu & produced by Arunabh Kumar for The Viral Fever. The story is set in Kota, Rajasthan, an educational hub famous for its coaching centres. The show follows the life of 16-year-old Vaibhav (Mayur More) who moves to Kota from Itarsi. It shows the life of students in the city, and Vaibhav's efforts to get into an Indian Institute of Technology (IIT) by cracking the Joint Entrance Examination. It also stars Jitendra Kumar, Ahsaas Channa, Alam Khan, Ranjan Raj, Revathi Pillai and Urvi Singh in prominent roles.

Saurabh Khanna, the creator of the show, said that he aims to change the popular narrative surrounding Kota and preparation for IIT-JEE & NEET in Indian pop culture to a more positive one via the show. The series premiered simultaneously on TVFPlay and YouTube from 16 April  to 14 May 2019. The series received a generally positive response from critics, praising its black & white setting, realism, and the major technical aspects of the series.

On 30 August 2021, Netflix announced that the series would be renewed for a second season, which was released on 24 September 2021. On 26 September 2021, Raghav Subbu confirmed that the third season was in the works.

Cast

Main
 Mayur More as Vaibhav Pandey
 Ranjan Raj as Balmukund Meena
 Alam Khan as Uday Gupta
 Jitendra Kumar as Jeetu Bhaiya
 Ahsaas Channa as Shivangi Ranawat
 Revathi Pillai as Vartika Ratawal
 Urvi Singh as Meenal Parekh

Recurring cast

Episodes

Series overview

Season 1

Season 2

Production

Development 
The screenwriter Saurabh Khanna who worked on The Viral Fever's Yeh Meri Family, started the scriptwriting process of his another project for TVF, after the release of Yeh Meri Family in July 2018. It was reported that the series is based on a teenager who joins a coaching institute that prepares students for the Indian Institute of Technology entrance examination(JEE Advanced), and deals with intense academic pressure and a colourful hostel experience. While Khanna compared the script of the series to Biswa Kalyan Rath's Laakhon Mein Ek, a similar web show released in late 2017, and a documentary An Engineered Dream, by Hemant Gaba, Khanna stated that the script is distinctively different from both the works as this show is set in India's coaching hub of Kota in Rajasthan.

Casting 
Khanna drew the inspiration of the series as he and the creative team of TVF (Arunabh Kumar, Amit Golani, and Biswapati Sarkar) were IIT graduates. The series star Jitendra Kumar in a principal character as Jeetu Bhaiya, as like all the TVF series and sketches featuring Kumar. He was also an ex-IIT graduate studied in Kota, and his experience made them easier for him to work in the series. Khanna stated about his role, adding that, "Teaching is a very humble, underrated profession, where those who practice it are not that high up on the social ladder. That's not how it is in Kota. Teachers are heavily paid and they are, consequently, under pressure to extract the best from students. Jeetu is one such teacher, a well-to-do guy with a taste for fine things in life. He is a motivator, a friend, a guide, students' 'agony aunt' and does not do lip service to make a student feel good. When Vaibhav requests to be allowed to move up to the elite students’ batch, Jeetu snaps at him to not beg." One of the characters Uday, is played Alam Khan who also appeared in Laakhon Mein Ek, having the similar storyline and role as of Kota Factory, but Khanna conveyed it as unintentional.

Filming 
Kota Factory was shot in colour and graded into monochrome later during post production (black-and-white). The shooting was kickstarted in January 2019 and ended within 30 days. After the announcement of the series' second season being renewed, the makers started their works of writing in July 2019. The team initially planned to shoot the series in March 2020, but the shooting was delayed indefinitely due to the COVID-19 pandemic lockdown in India. The makers later started the shooting process in September 2020, and was filmed across two to three months in and around Madhya Pradesh. The crew shot the series under the supervision of a special team designated as in order to observe the crew members abiding the COVID-19 protocol. In January 2021, the makers announced that the shooting of the series had been wrapped.

Soundtrack

Season 1 
The first season's soundtrack is composed by Karthik Rao and Simran Hora, and was produced by Ankur Tewari. It features twelve original compositions with two songs "The Gentleman" sung and written by Simran Hora and "Main Bola Hey!" sung by Abhishek Yadav, Manish Chandwani and Karthik Rao. The soundtrack album was released on 23 May 2019, through media streaming platforms and in YouTube through the official channel of TVF, where the songs are independently released without launching a separate jukebox format. In addition to the original soundtrack, Kota Factory also features two songs composed by Ankur Tewari, Karsh Kale and his rock band The Ghalat Family, whereas the songs were written by Ankur Tewari. The songs were released as a part of the additional soundtrack released on 3 June 2019.

Season 2 
The second season's soundtrack is also composed by Karthik Rao and Simran Hora. It features nine original compositions with two songs "Tere Jaisa" sung by Vaibhav Bundhoo and Kamakshi Khanna and "Umbilical" sung by Jazim Sharma and written by Alok Ranjan Srivastava. The soundtrack album was released on 24 September 2021.

Themes 
Kota Factory drew inspiration from the life of aspiring engineering students, who join the coaching institute in Kota, to crack the IIT entrance exam. This plot has been found similar to the 2009 film 3 Idiots, the web series Laakhon Mein Ek and the docu-drama An Engineer's Dream. But, Tanul Thakur of the British magazine The Wire, deploys the realistic portrayals of the series as compared to the feature films based on the same theme. Thakur stated that the first half of the series is interesting due to the "intellectual curiosity about the city, and its people". He added that apart from the realistic portrayals, it also added the acceptance to abnormalities in the coaching life, as instead of critiquing the coaching institute. The series also has the theme of how the life of a student in Kota goes it tells the hardships of a student.

Release 
Kota Factory sponsored with Unacademy in order to promote the series, based on its storyline. In December 2018, TVF released the official teaser through its YouTube channel which received wide response from audiences. Later, the official trailer of the first season was unveiled on 28 March 2019. The series consisting of five episodes was released simultaneously through TVF Play and YouTube from 16 April 2019, with each episode being aired per week. The series finale premiered on 14 May 2019.

After the second season being renewed Netflix acquired the distribution rights of the series; an official announcement regarding Season 2 was made on 3 March 2021, where Netflix released several other original contents in their 2021 slate. This marked TVF's second collaboration with the platform after Yeh Meri Family. On 30 August 2021, Netflix announced that the second season of the series will premiere on 24 September 2021.

Reception
Devasheesh Pandey of News18 praised the cinematography, art direction, sound design as well as the acting performances of the show and gave it a rating of 3.5 out of 5 saying that, "Kota Factory maintains an edge over other shows in the genre, courtesy of its on-point, deadpan humour and a relatably bittersweet aftertaste of existential battle that the protagonist is facing." Ishita Sengupta of The Indian Express found the show to be engaging and applauded it saying that, "The ingenuity of Kota Factory lies in its ability to deal with different narrative strands and coalesce them effortlessly." Ishita also felt that the performances of the actors, specially Mayur More and Ranjan Raj, add a lot of value to the show. Rahul Desai of Film Companion was impressed with the mature depiction of the subject at hand and praised the acting performances as well as the writing of the show saying that, "Kota Factory’s biggest asset is its writing which somehow maintains a semi-dramatic progression without compromising on the factual tone of the series."

Gautam Batra of Koimoi praised the direction and the acting performances of the show and gave it a rating of 4 out of 5 saying that, "the web series has taken a very less dramatic route to narrate the story which makes it extremely relatable watch." Priyanka Bansal of The Quint praised the show for presenting a fresh perspective on the education system in India. Impressed with the acting performances, production quality and music of Kota Factory, Priyanka gave the show a rating of 3.5 out of 5 and said that, "If you are looking for something worthwhile, The Kota Factory can be a nice watch that will make you think not about death and gloom but leave you with optimism." Tanul Thakur of The Wire praised the show for being realistic and relatable but felt that the show shies away from criticising the culture of coaching institutes prevalent in the Indian society. Dilip D'Souza writing for The Caravan praised the storytelling, as well.

References

External links
 

TVF Play Shows
Hindi-language web series
Indian drama web series
2019 web series debuts
Indian Institutes of Technology in fiction
Hindi-language Netflix original programming
Indian television series distributed by Netflix
Kota, Rajasthan
2010s YouTube series